This is a list of notable mosques in Mexico (Arabic: Masjid, Spanish: Mezquita), including Islamic places of worship that do not qualify as traditional mosques.

As of 2018, there are more than 10 established mosques in Mexico. Muslim-friendly facilities are not widely available, there are a few prayer facilities spread across the country. These Muslim-friendly facilities are used by the local Muslim community, and increasingly by Muslim tourists.

Notable individual mosques

See also

 Islam in Mexico
 Religion in Mexico
 List of mosques in the Americas
 List of mosques in Brazil
 Lists of mosques (worldwide)
 List of mosques in the United States
 List of mosques in Canada
 List of the oldest mosques in the world

References 

 
Mexico
Mosques